Hawley was a small settlement in Fairfield Township, Russell County, Kansas, United States.

History
Hawley was issued a post office in 1880. The post office was discontinued in 1909. The population in 1910 was 33.

References

Former populated places in Russell County, Kansas
Former populated places in Kansas